Eternity is an EP by Amplifier, released in 2008. The EP is made up of previously unreleased songs recorded between 1998 and 2003.

Track listing
 "Amplified 99" – 4:46
 "Area 51" – 5:44
 "The Ways of Amplifier" – 6:47
 "My Corrosion" – 5:49
 "Departure Lounge" – 6:36
 "Number One Son" – 6:05

References

External links
Lyrics Contains lyrics to all Amplifier songs.

Amplifier (band) albums
2008 EPs